Eric Halladay (9 July 1930 – 19 July 1997) was a British historian, academic, and rowing coach. He was Master of Grey College, Durham from 1980 to 1989, Rector of St Aidan's College, Durham from 1990 to 1991, and Principal of St Chad's College, Durham from 1991 to 1994.

Early life
Halladay was born in Huddersfield on 9 July 1930 and was the son of a vicar. He was educated at Durham School, where he learnt to row on the River Wear. He studied history at St John's College, Cambridge and was a member of the Lady Margaret Boat Club. Following his graduation from the University of Cambridge, he studied theology at Ripon Hall, Oxford, for one year.

Career

Military service
On 14 February 1949, as part of National Service, he was granted an emergency commission in the Royal Regiment of Artillery with the rank of second lieutenant. He served with the 5th Royal Horse Artillery. On 21 December 1951, he was transferred to the Supplementary Reserve officers and granted seniority in the rank of second lieutenant from 4 August 1950. On 7 June 1952, he was promoted to acting lieutenant. He was promoted to lieutenant on 9 July 1953 with seniority from 7 July 1952. On 22 July 1958, he was transferred to the Territorial Army Reserve of Officers.

Academic career
Halladay began his academic career not as a lecturer but a teacher. He taught history at Exeter School, a private school in Exeter, Devon. In 1960, he was appointed a senior lecturer at the Royal Military Academy Sandhurst. While his main duties at the academy were to teach the officer cadets military history, he also coached the Boat Club.

He joined Durham University in 1964 as a lecturer in history. He specialised in military and African history. The same year, he was appointed senior tutor of Grey College, Durham. He co-wrote The Building of Modern Africa with D. D. Rooney which was published in 1966. He was appointed Vice-Master of Grey in 1967, therefore deputising to the then Master Sidney Holgate. In 1972, his book The Emergent Continent: Africa in the Nineteenth Century was published. In 1980, he became the second Master of Grey College. As the head of college, he became a part-time lecturer. He then moved colleges, and served as Principal of St Chad's College, Durham from 1991 to 1994.

Rowing coach
In 1963, Halladay coached a team from the Royal Military Academy Sandhurst to win the Ladies' Challenge Plate. This was the first Henley Royal Regatta he would win.

References

 

 
 
 
 
 
 

1930 births
1997 deaths
Academics of Durham University
Masters of Grey College, Durham
Principals of St Chad's College, Durham
People educated at Durham School
Alumni of St John's College, Cambridge
Royal Artillery officers
Alumni of Ripon College Cuddesdon
20th-century British historians
Stewards of Henley Royal Regatta
Schoolteachers from Devon
People from Huddersfield